Peter Nigel Terry (15 August 1945 – 30 April 2015) was an English stage, film, and television actor, typically in historical and period roles.  He played Prince John in Anthony Harvey's film The Lion in Winter (1968) and King Arthur in John Boorman's Excalibur (1981).

Early life
Terry was born on 15 August 1945 in Bristol, the son of Frank Albert Terry OBE, DFC, a pilot in the Royal Air Force, and his wife, Doreen. He was the first baby born in Bristol after the end of the Second World War. The family soon moved to Truro, Cornwall where his father worked as a probation officer. Terry attended Truro School in Truro, where he developed an interest in acting and became skilled at drawing and painting.  

His parents encouraged him to go on the stage, and after working briefly in forestry and as a petrol pump attendant, he joined the National Youth Theatre. He enrolled at London's Central School of Speech and Drama in 1963, working both on stage and behind the scenes. He joined the Oxford Meadow Players in 1966, working initially as assistant stage manager.

Career

Theatre

Terry worked mostly in theatre. After training with repertory companies like the Oxford Meadow Players and Bristol Old Vic, Terry appeared in many productions with the Royal Shakespeare Company, the Round House Theatre and the Royal Court Theatre. Among his roles was Daniel de Bosola in the 1989 Royal Shakespeare Company production of John Webster's The Duchess of Malfi. In the same year he played Pericles in David Thacker's production of Pericles, Prince of Tyre.

Films
In addition to Excalibur, he appeared in about 20 films, most notably The Lion in Winter in 1968 with Katharine Hepburn, Peter O'Toole and Anthony Hopkins, and Derek Jarman's Caravaggio in 1986, where he played the title character. He worked with Jarman on four more films: "The Last of England" (1988), "War Requiem" (1989), "Edward II" (1991) and "Blue" (1993).

His last film role was in Troy in 2004, playing the Trojan high priest.

Television
An early television appearance was as the agoraphobic Harry Mandrake in the Randall and Hopkirk (Deceased) episode "Somebody Just Walked Over My Grave" (1970).

His main US and British television appearances include Covington Cross, a series set in medieval times. He also appeared in Casualty as Denny, as General Cobb in the Doctor Who episode "The Doctor's Daughter" and as Gabriel Piton in Highlander: The Series. He also played Sam Jacobs in a two-part Waking the Dead episode titled "Anger Management". He appeared in Pie in the Sky series 3 episode 3 "Irish Stew" as Byron de Goris. He also appeared in an episode of Foyle's War.

Personal life
After 30 years of living in London, Terry returned to reside in Cornwall in 1993. Terry was a very private person.

He died in Newquay, Cornwall, of emphysema, on 30 April 2015. In the absence of any surviving close family, his memorial service was organised by close friends Maggie Steed and David Horovitch in Truro on 19 May 2015, attended by fellow actors and friends.

Selected filmography

The Lion in Winter (1968) - John
Slade in Flame (1975) - Assistant Disc Jockey (uncredited)
Excalibur (1981) - King Arthur
Sylvia (1985) - Aden Morris
Déjà Vu (1985) - Michael / Greg
Caravaggio (1986) - Caravaggio
On Wings of Fire (1986) - Zarathustra
The Last of England (1987) - Narrator (voice)
War Requiem (1989) - Abraham
Edward II (1991) - Mortimer
Christopher Columbus: The Discovery (1992) - Roldan
Blue (1993) - Narrator (voice)
Pie In The Sky (1996, TV series) - Episode "Irish Stew" - Byron de Goris/James Jackson
The Hunchback (1997, TV movie)
Far From the Madding Crowd (1998, TV movie) - Mr. Boldwood
On Wings of Fire (2001) - Zarathustra
The Emperor's New Clothes (2001) - Montholon
The Search for John Gissing (2001) - Alan Jardeen
FeardotCom (2002) - Turnbull
The Ride (2003) - Mr. Silverstone
The Tulse Luper Suitcases (2003) - Sesame Esau
Troy (2004) - Archeptolemus
Red Mercury (2005) - Lindsey
Blackbeard (2006, TV mini-series) - Calico Billy
Genghis Khan: The Story of a Lifetime (2010) - Mulwick

References

External links

 Profile, filmreference.com; accessed 26 January 2016.

1945 births
2015 deaths
Deaths from emphysema
English male film actors
English male stage actors
English male television actors
20th-century English male actors
21st-century English male actors
People educated at Truro School
Male actors from Bristol
National Youth Theatre members